This is a list of events from British radio in 1923.

Events

January
8 January – First outside broadcast by the British Broadcasting Company, a British National Opera Company production of The Magic Flute from the Royal Opera House, Covent Garden, London.
18 January – The Postmaster General grants the BBC a licence to broadcast.

February
13 February – First BBC broadcast from Cardiff (station 5WA). Mostyn Thomas opens the programme, singing Dafydd y Garreg Wen and Gwilym Davies becomes the first speaker to broadcast in the Welsh language.

March
6 March – First BBC broadcast from Glasgow (station 5SC). It broadcasts excerpts from an opera.
19 March – First BBC outside broadcast in Scotland, from the Coliseum Theatre, Glasgow.

April to August
No events.

May
30 May – BBC Cardiff (station 5WA) broadcasts the first full performance of a new orchestral opera.

June to August
No events.

September
28 September – Vol. 1 No. 1 of The Radio Times, the world's first broadcast listings magazine detailing Official Programmes of the British Broadcasting Company for the week commencing Sunday 30 September is published.
September – The BBC delivers the first live outside broadcast, relaying a speech by Ernest Rutherford from a British Association meeting held at the Philharmonic Hall, Liverpool. The speech is relayed to Manchester and London, and from London to Glasgow, Newcastle, Cardiff and Birmingham, and broadcast from each of those cities.

October
10 October – Official opening of the BBC's 2BD Aberdeen radio station, the first programme of which, at 9 pm, is an address by the Marquess of Aberdeen and Temair and music from the Pipers and Military Band of 2nd Gordon Highlanders.
17 October – Official opening of the BBC's 6BM Bournemouth radio station, the first programme of which, at 8 pm, is the Bournemouth Municipal Military Band conducted by Captain W. Featherston.

November
16 November – First BBC broadcast from Sheffield (station 2FL).

December
2 December – The first BBC radio broadcast in Gaelic language is broadcast throughout Scotland. It is a 15-minute religious address by Rev. John Bain, recorded in the High United Free Church in Aberdeen. Two weeks later, a recital of Gaelic singing is aired.
19 December – The BBC broadcasts an adaptation of A Christmas Carol, Dickens' seasonal story, made by R. E. Jeffrey.
31 December – The BBC broadcasts the chimes of Big Ben for the first time.

Births
15 January – Ivor Cutler, Scottish poet, songwriter and humorist (died 2006)
26 January – Patricia Hughes, continuity announcer (died 2013)
2 March – Jean Metcalfe, radio broadcaster (died 2000)
16 July – Larry Stephens, comedy scriptwriter (died 1959)
10 October – Nicholas Parsons, entertainer (died 2020)
13 October – Cyril Shaps, character actor (died 2003)
3 December – Trevor Bailey, cricketer and commentator (died 2011)
22 December – John Ebdon, radio broadcaster, Graecophile, author and director of the London Planetarium (died 2005)

Notes

References 

 
Years in British radio
Radio